Aldão is a civil parish in the municipality of Guimarães in the Braga District of Portugal. The population in 2021 was 1,278, in an area of 1.55 km2.

References

Freguesias of Guimarães